Joseph Eckford (8 November 1814 – 22 November 1884) was an Australian politician.

He was born at Newcastle to mariner William Eckford and Mary Orrell. He was a publican before entering politics, and on 19 June 1848 he married Harriet Kerwin, with whom he had ten children. In 1860 he was elected to the New South Wales Legislative Assembly for Wollombi. He served until his defeat in 1872. He returned to the Assembly in 1877, serving until he was defeated again in 1882. Eckford died in Sydney in 1884.

References

 

1814 births
1884 deaths
Members of the New South Wales Legislative Assembly
19th-century Australian politicians